The  (Viennese Democratic Women's Association) was the first political association of women in Austria.
It was founded by Karoline von Perin-Gradenstein during the Revolution of 1848, but dissolved immediately after the suppression of the revolution.

Goals of the association were the achievement of equality for women through education, as well as giving humanitarian aid to the victims of the revolutionary fighting. Men were allowed to participate in meetings under certain circumstances, but only women could become full members with voting rights.

After its forced dissolution, its former members were accused of having been "daughter's of joy"; an allegation that was known to have been a politically-motivated lie to contemporaries.

Notes

See also 
Allgemeiner Österreichischer Frauenverein

References

Political organisations based in Austria
Women's suffrage in Austria
Feminist organizations in Austria
1848 establishments in the Austrian Empire
1848 disestablishments in the Austrian Empire